The 1944 Winter Olympics, which would have been officially known as the V Olympic Winter Games (after the cancellation of 1940s V Olympic Winter Games) (Italian: V Giochi olimpici invernali), were to have been celebrated in February 1944 in Cortina d'Ampezzo, Italy. Cortina d'Ampezzo had been awarded the games in June 1939, but with the onset of World War II, the 1944 Winter Olympics were cancelled in 1941.

The V Olympic Winter Games eventually took place in St. Moritz, Switzerland, in 1948; Cortina d'Ampezzo eventually hosted the 1956 Winter Olympics and will co-host the 2026 Winter Olympics with Milan.

See also

 
Cancelled Olympic Games
Events cancelled due to World War II
Olympic Games in Italy
Sport in Cortina d'Ampezzo
1944 in multi-sport events
Winter Olympics by year
1944 in Italian sport